The river Švėtė flows through the Šiauliai and Joniškis districts in the northern part of Lithuania, and the southern part of Latvia. The source of the Švėtė is near Tulominai, about 16 km southeast of Kuršėnai, and the river flows north passing by Žagarė, near the Latvian border. It is a tributary of the Lielupe, joining it 8 km to the northwest of Jelgava. The Lielupe ultimately flows into the Baltic Sea.

The upper part of the Švėtė can dry up completely in very dry summers, and its main tributaries are the Šakyna, Žarė, Tērvete, Bērze, Žvairilas, Bukiškis, Juodupis, Katmilžis and Vilkija rivers.

References

Rivers of Lithuania
Rivers of Latvia
International rivers of Europe
Latvia–Lithuania border